Aviastar-TU Airlines is a cargo charter airline which operates principally out of Ramenskoye Airport in Moscow, Russia. Its headquarters is located in Zhukovsky, Moscow Oblast.

History
The airline began operating domestic and international charter flights in 2000. Aviastar-TU, as an aircraft operator, has a historical affiliation with Aviastar-SP, an aircraft builder.

After the incident of Flight 1906, the Federal Air Transport Agency imposed a ban on passenger transport due to the airline's lack of a spare aircraft. In November 2011, after a number of deficiencies were identified by European inspectors, the European Aviation Safety Agency also imposed an additional ban on flights to EU countries, which was lifted at the end of December 2011.

On 8 April 2022, the US Department of Commerce restricted flights on aircraft manufactured in the US for Aeroflot, Aviastar, Azur Air, Belavia, Rossiya and Utair. It seems the US wants to reclaim ownership of the intellectual property. On 16 June, the US broadened its restrictions on the six airlines after violations of the sanctions regime were detected. The effect of the restrictions is to ground the US-manufactured part of its fleet.

Fleet

Current fleet
The Aviastar-TU fleet consists of the following aircraft (as of December 2022):

Former fleet
Aviastar-TU fleet formerly operated the following aircraft:

Accidents and incidents
On 22 March 2010, Aviastar-TU Flight 1906, a Tupolev Tu-204-100 (RA-64011) crashed on approach to Moscow Domodedovo International Airport. Only eight crew members were on board, and all of them survived. Immediately upon the accident, the Russian aviation supervisory authority suspended Aviastar-TU from carrying passengers, pending an examination of the airline's flight operations. In September 2010, the Russian aviation supervisory authority, МАК, released its final report into the accident. The cause of the accident was attributed to pilot error, with a number of factors contributing to the accident including inadequate crew training and lack of cockpit resource management, failure of autoflight systems and regulatory violations by Aviastar-TU.

On 24 August 2016, a Tupolev Tu-204-100C (RA-64021) operating Flight 9625, suffered a hard landing  at Alykel Airport. Information from the investigation shows that the aircraft bounced on touchdown, the spoilers then automatically extended, after which the aircraft landed hard with an acceleration of +3,05G. The aircraft taxied to the parking position, where examination revealed that the rear spar of the wing sustained. All 4 crew members on board were safely evacuated.

On 8 January 2022, a Tupolev Tu-204-100C (RA-64032), operating Flight 6534 for Cainiao, was written off after a fire started during pushback from its gate at Hangzhou Xiaoshan International Airport and burnt through the fuselage, causing the rear of the aircraft to collapse. All 8 crew members on board were safely evacuated.

See also
List of airlines of Russia

References

External links

 Official website 

Airlines established in 2000
Airlines of Russia
Companies based in Moscow
Cargo airlines of Russia
2000 establishments in Russia